Gangapur is a village and a Gram panchayat in Bellaguntha block in Ganjam district in the state of Odisha, India.

Villages in Ganjam district